A poor box, alms box,  offertory box, or mite box is a box that is used to collect coins for charitable purposes. They can be found in most Christian churches built before the 19th century and were the main source of funds for poor relief before societies decided to organize the process and make the public authorities responsible for this.

Contemporary mite boxes are usually made of cardboard and given out to church congregations during the Lenten season.  The mite boxes are collected by the church, and the donations are given to the poor. Mite boxes are popular with children because they can fill them with small change, teaching them the principle of giving alms to the poor. The Mite box promotes the spirit of contributing based on the intent to help others, and not on the monetary amount.

History 
The origin of the mite box is very old. In 2 Kings 12:9, the priest Jehoiada bored a hole in the lid of a chest and placed it near the first altar, however this was to fund maintenance rather than alms.

Pope Innocent III, at the end of the twelfth century, allowed some mite boxes to be placed in churches so that the faithful people could at any time dispose their alms.

Many Catholic parish churches in Ireland have two collection boxes, one "for the church" and the other "for the poor".

Mite

The term mite, according to the dictionary, is defined as any of the following:

 a very small contribution or amount of money, such as a widow's mite.
 a very small object, creature, or particle. 
 a coin of very small value, especially an obsolete British coin worth half a farthing.

An alms box is a strong chest or box often fastened to the wall of a church to receive offerings for the poor.

The etymology of the word mite comes through Middle English and Middle Dutch from the Middle Low German mīte, a small Flemish coin or tiny animal. In biblical times, a mite or lepton was a small coin of almost no worth.

See also 
Coinage of Alexander Jannaeus, King of Judea
Lesson of the widow's mite
Lutheran Women's Missionary League

References  

Alms in Christianity
Containers

de:Gotteskasten